, also known by his Chinese style name , was a politician and bureaucrat of the Ryukyu Kingdom. He was born to an aristocrat family Ba-uji Yonabaru Dunchi.

King Shō Kei dispatched Prince Gushichan Chōri (also known as Shō Shōki ) and him in 1748 to celebrate Tokugawa Ieshige succeeded as shōgun of the Tokugawa shogunate. They sailed back in the next year.

He served as a member of sanshikan from 1752 to 1754.

References

1698 births
1754 deaths
Ueekata
Sanshikan
People of the Ryukyu Kingdom
Ryukyuan people
18th-century Ryukyuan people